A with grave (А̀ а̀; italics: А̀ а̀)  a letter of the Cyrillic script. In all its forms it looks exactly like the Latin letter A with grave (À à À à).

Computing codes
Being a relatively recent letter, not present in any legacy 8-bit Cyrillic encoding, the letter А̀ is not represented directly by a precomposed character in Unicode either; it has to be composed as А+◌̀ (U+0300).

Usage
 is often used in South Slavic languages,  where it's used for accents on the vowels. The mark is commonly used in them to differentiate homophones, such as па̀ра ("steam") and пара̀ ("cent"), въ̀лна ("wool") and вълна̀ ("wave"). 

Stress marks are optional and are regularly used in several special books like dictionaries, primers, or textbooks for foreigners, as stress is very unpredictable in all of these. However, in general texts, stress marks are rarely used. Mainly to prevent ambiguity or to show the pronunciation of foreign words.

Bulgarian

This is in the larger part in Bulgarian and is also the accent used in the Standard Bulgarian language. Because it existed in the past in all Bulgarian dialects, it can be called dynamic accent. Its characteristics of it are highly similar as those in the accent of the other south-eastern Slavic languages

Related letters and other similar characters
A a : Latin letter A
À à : Latin letter À — a variant of ⟨a⟩ used in languages including French, Italian, and Portuguese
А а : Cyrillic letter А
Cyrillic characters in Unicode

References

Letters with grave
Cyrillic letters with diacritics